Guillermo Saucedo (born 23 November 1940) is an Argentine fencer. He competed at the 1968 and 1972 Summer Olympics.

References

1940 births
Living people
Argentine male fencers
Olympic fencers of Argentina
Fencers at the 1968 Summer Olympics
Fencers at the 1972 Summer Olympics
Fencers from Buenos Aires
Pan American Games medalists in fencing
Pan American Games gold medalists for Argentina
Pan American Games silver medalists for Argentina
Pan American Games bronze medalists for Argentina
Fencers at the 1963 Pan American Games
Fencers at the 1967 Pan American Games